Eusebio Acea Colarte (born 28 February 1969) is a Cuban rower. He competed in the 2000 Summer Olympics.

References

External links
 
 
 

1969 births
Living people
Rowers at the 2000 Summer Olympics
Cuban male rowers
Olympic rowers of Cuba
Pan American Games medalists in rowing
Pan American Games bronze medalists for Cuba
Rowers at the 1995 Pan American Games
Rowers at the 1999 Pan American Games
Medalists at the 1999 Pan American Games
20th-century Cuban people